Chapple (Canada 2016 Census population 638) is a township municipality in Rainy River District in Northwestern Ontario, Canada.

Communities
Communities located in the township include: 
 Barwick
 Black Hawk – near Barwick Road and Highway 600
 Finland – Highway 71 near Korpi/Lampi Road
 Manders – on Highway 11 at the west of the township
 Shenston – Fehr Road and Tait Road

The township is served by Ontario Highway 71, a branch of the Trans-Canada Highway, and by Highway 600.

History
It was named after Thomas William Chapple, a former Ontario MPP from 1894 to 1898, who served as judge for the Rainy River District from 1898 to 1926. Before politics Chapple was a lawyer.

Demographics 

Climate
Barwick has a humid continental climate (Köppen Dfb).

Government
Township Council consists of a mayor and four councillors.

Attractions
 Norlund Chapel – built from bell tower from St. Patrick's Church
 River View Park
 Pineview Conservative Mennonite Church
 Chapple Museum – formerly Gills Trading Post
 Chapple Lighthouse – built 2003
 Barwick Waterfront
 Saint Paul's Heritage Church – former Anglican Church

See also
 List of townships in Ontario

References

External links
 

Municipalities in Rainy River District
Single-tier municipalities in Ontario
Township municipalities in Ontario